Sunan Airport may refer to:
Pyongyang Sunan International Airport in North Korea
Sunan Shuofang International Airport in China